Anchor Records was a UK-based record label, co-founded by Ian Ralfini and the American Broadcasting Companies, which owned ABC Records in the United States, in 1974. ABC Records marketed (distributed) Anchor albums in the US, and Anchor Records issued many ABC albums in the United Kingdom as "ABC Records Marketed by Anchor Records."

The Anchor Records label was black with silver print. The logo, at the top of the label, was a British sailor with an anchor behind him and the words "ANCHOR RECORDS LIMITED" above the sailor's hat and the word ANCHOR below. Anchor ceased operations in 1978, when ABC Records was purchased by MCA Records.

Partial discography

Singles
16 528 AT:  Stretch - Why Did You Do It / Write Me A Note (7")
ANC 1002:   Ace - How Long (7")
ANC 1004:   Brett Smiley - Va Va Va Voom / Space Ace	(7")
ANC 1008:   Phillip [sic] & Vanessa - Two Sleepy People / You Know (7") [1974] 
ANC 1017:   Philip & Vanessa - Love / Baby I Loved You (7") [1975]  
ANC 1021:   Stretch - Why Did You Do It? (7")
ANC 1043:   The Adverts - Gary Gilmore's Eyes / Bored Teenagers (7")
ANC 1045:   Wesley - Mickey Mouse, Donald Duck, Goofy & the Gang / Don't It Make Your Blue Eyes Cry  (7")
ANC 1046:   Steel Pulse - Nyah Luv (7")
ANC 1047:   The Adverts - Safety In Numbers / We Who Wait (7")
ANC 1054:   Kate Robbins - Tomorrow / Crowds Of You (7")
ANC 1061:   Donna McGhee  - Do As I Do / Mr. Blindman (12")
ABE 12003:  Steely Dan - Do It Again (12")
AN 21005: CADO BELLE - AIRPORT SHUTDOWN (7") MONO/STEREO 1976 - PROMO NFS
45-A-22:    Ray King - I Confess/Call Me Darling (7") Mono

Albums
ANCL 2001: Ace - Five-A-Side
ANCL 2002: Sam Leno - Ordinary Man
ANCL 2003: Philip & Vanessa - Two Sleepy People
ANCL 2005: Blue Goose - Blue Goose
ANCL 2006: Susan Webb - Bye-Bye Pretty Baby
ANCL 2007: Aj Webber - Aj Webber
ANCL 2008: Cole Younger - Cole Younger
ANCL 2010: Moonrider - Moonrider
ANCL 2011: Alice Cooper - Welcome to My Nightmare
ANCL 2012: Paxton Brothers - The Paxton Brothers (James and Frank Paxton)
ANCL 2013: Ace - Time For Another
ANCL 2014: Stretch - Elastique
ANCL 2015: Cado Belle - Cado Belle [1976] Scottish
ANCL 2016: Stretch -  You Can't Beat Your Brain For Entertainment
ANCL 2017: Patti Boulaye - Patti Boulaye
ANCL 2018: John Weider - John Weider
ANCL 2019: Sioux - Sioux
ANCL 2020: Ace - No Strings
ANCL 2021: Scrounger - Snap
ANCL 2022: George Hamilton IV - Fine Lace and Homespun Cloth
ANCL 2023: Stretch - Lifeblood
ANCL 2026: George Hamilton IV - Feel Like a Million
ANCL 2027: Donna McGhee - Make It Last Forever

UK issues of US ABC albums:
Anchor ABCL-5005: Easy Rider: - Easy Rider (Soundtrack)
Anchor ABCL-5019: Ralph Burns: - Cabaret (Soundtrack)
Anchor ABCL-5073: Nelson Riddle - Paint Your Wagon (Soundtrack)
Anchor ABCL-5146: B. J. Thomas - Help Me Make It (To My Rockin' Chair)
Anchor ABCL-5156: Joe Walsh - You Can't Argue with a Sick Mind
Anchor ABCL-5160: Amazing Rhythm Aces - Too Stuffed to Jump
Anchor ABCL-5240: Joe Walsh -  So Far So Good

See also
 List of record labels

References

External links
Anchor Records - Discography

Defunct record labels of the United Kingdom
Rock record labels
Record labels established in 1974
Record labels disestablished in 1978
Record labels